Carysfort is a coral reef located within the Florida Keys National Marine Sanctuary. It lies to the east of Key Largo, within the Key Largo Existing Management Area, which is immediately to the east of John Pennekamp Coral Reef State Park. This reef is within a Sanctuary Preservation Area (SPA).  The reef is northeast of The Elbow.

The reef is named after , which ran aground there (but did not sink) in 1770.

The Carysfort Reef Light is near the center of the SPA.

References
 NOAA National Marine Sanctuary Maps, Florida Keys East
 NOAA website on Carysfort Reef
 NOAA map

External links
 Benthic Habitat Map

Coral reefs of the Florida Keys